Edison McLean (born September 11, 1969) is a male skeet shooting athlete from the Cayman Islands.

Olympic skeet achievements 
2011 NatWest Island Games – first Caymanian gold medalist in Olympic skeet.

References

External links 
 ISSF Portrait
 Cayman Islands Equestrian Federation by Cayman Islands Olympic Committee.

Living people
1969 births
Skeet shooters